In mathematics, an upper set (also called an upward closed set, an upset, or an isotone set in X) of a partially ordered set  is a subset  with the following property: if s is in S and if x in X is larger than s (that is, if ), then x is in S. In other words, this means that any x element of X that is  to some element of S is necessarily also an element of S. 

Definition

Let  be a preordered set. 
for all  and all  if  then 

for all  and all  if  then 

This choice of terminology fails to reflect the notion of an ideal of a lattice because a lower set of a lattice is not necessarily a sublattice.

Properties

 Every partially ordered set is an upper set of itself. 
 The intersection and the union of any family of upper sets is again an upper set. 
 The complement of any upper set is a lower set, and vice versa.
 Given a partially ordered set  the family of upper sets of  ordered with the inclusion relation is a complete lattice, the upper set lattice.
 Dually, the smallest lower set containing  is denoted using a down arrow as 
 A lower set is called principal if it is of the form  where  is an element of 
 Every lower set  of a finite partially ordered set  is equal to the smallest lower set containing all maximal elements of  
 where  denotes the set containing the maximal elements of 
 A directed lower set is called an order ideal.
 For partial orders satisfying the descending chain condition, antichains and upper sets are in one-to-one correspondence via the following bijections: map each antichain to its  upper closure (see below); conversely, map each upper set to the set of its minimal elements.

Upper closure and lower closure

and 
 

In this way,  and  where upper sets and lower sets of this form are called principal. The upper closure and lower closure of a set are, respectively, the smallest upper set and lower set containing it.

As a result, the upper closure of a set is equal to the intersection of all upper sets containing it, and similarly for lower sets. (Indeed, this is a general phenomenon of closure operators. For example, the topological closure of a set is the intersection of all closed sets containing it; the span of a set of vectors is the intersection of all subspaces containing it; the subgroup generated by a subset of a group is the intersection of all subgroups containing it; the ideal generated by a subset of a ring is the intersection of all ideals containing it; and so on.)

Ordinal numbers

An ordinal number is usually identified with the set of all smaller ordinal numbers. Thus each ordinal number forms a lower set in the class of all ordinal numbers, which are totally ordered by set inclusion.

See also

 Abstract simplicial complex (also called: Independence system) - a set-family that is downwards-closed with respect to the containment relation.
 Cofinal set – a subset  of a partially ordered set  that contains for every element  some element  such that

References

 
  
 Hoffman, K. H. (2001), The low separation axioms (T0) and (T1)

Order theory

ru:Частично упорядоченное множество#Верхнее и нижнее множество